The Democratic Confederation of San Marino Workers (CDLS) is a national trade union center in San Marino. It was formed November 12, 1957 and is affiliated with the International Trade Union Confederation.

Leadership
Secretary general:
 Marino Bugli (1960–1969)
 Giancarlo Ghironzi (1969–1971)
 Antonio Zanotti (1971–1972)
 Giovanni Giardi (1972–1984)
 Antonio Macina (1984–1987)
 Rita Ghironzi (1987–1991)
 Marco Beccari (1991-current)

Federations
The CDLS consists of four federations of workers as well as the Pensioners' Federation (Federazione Pensionati).
 Industry Workers' Federation (Federazione dei Lavoratori dell’Industria)
 State Workers' Federation (Federazione Pubblico Impiego)
 Building Workers' Federation (Federazione Lavoratori delle Costruzioni)
 Service Workers' Federation (Federazione Lavoratori dei Servizi)

References

External links
 CDLS official site.

Trade unions in San Marino
International Trade Union Confederation
1957 establishments in San Marino
Trade unions established in 1957